Pandit Rajaram alias Raja Kale is an Indian vocalist, composer, and scholar of Indian classical, semi-classical, and devotional music. He is a senior disciple of Pandit Jitendra Abhisheki. He also received valuable guidance from Pt. C. P. Rele and Pt. Balasaheb Poonchwale from the Gwalior gharana. Pt. Raja Kale is known for rendering both old and new Hindustani classical music with an approach that is at once eclectic and focused on the performance.

He holds a PhD (1990) with the thesis Importance of Bandish in Khayal. He has also received senior fellowship from the Department of Culture of the Government of India for the study of the subject: "Comparative study and analysis of  "Gayaki" of Legendary singers Pandit Bhimsen Joshi, Pandit Kumar Gandharva, Pandit Jitendra Abhisheki, and Pandit Jasraj. He has performed live on several notable occasions, and on broadcast media, including TV, Radio in India and KZSU Stanford 90.1 FM on Chaitime.

Early life and background

Pt. Raja Kale received his initiation in music from his father Prabhakarrao Kale, and further training from Pandit Uttamrao Agnihotri. He then studied music with Pandit Jitendra Abhisheki, a veteran vocalist and a great composer of classical and semi-classical forms of Hindustani classical music.

Awards
Vatsalabai Joshi Puraskar, 2007
Pandit Bhimsen Joshi Smriti Puraskar 2021

Discography
 Raag Sarita, HMV
 Seasons, Pan Music
 Bandish, Prathamesh Arts 
 Apoorva Geete, Mala entertainment
 Album on Classical Music, Alurkar Cassette Co.
 Krishna, Ninad Music Co. 
 HM Volume 2, Colour Red Dog: Raja Kale, HMV

Notable performances
 Tansen Samaroh, Gwalior
 Sawai Gandharva Punyatithi Mahotsov, Pune
 Guru Shishya Parampara concert, with Guru Jitendra Abhisheki, ICCR New Delhi

References

Hindustani composers
Hindustani singers
Living people
Year of birth missing (living people)